The Telugu Filmfare Best Lyricist Award is given by the Filmfare magazine as part of its annual Filmfare Awards for Telugu films.

The award was first given in 2005. Here is a list of the award winners and the films for which they won. Sirivennela won most awards in this category 5 times.

See also 
 Filmfare Awards (Telugu)
 Cinema of Andhra Pradesh

References

Lyricist
Indian music awards